Michael Leahy may refer to:

 Michael Leahy (author) (born 1953), American writer
 Michael Leahy (politician) (1932–2007), Irish politician
 Michael P. T. Leahy (1934–2007), English philosopher
 Michael Leahy (trade unionist) (born 1949), General Secretary of the British Trade Union Community
 Mick Leahy (explorer) (1901–1979), Australian explorer
 Mick Leahy (boxer) (1935–2010), Irish/British boxer
 Mick Leahy (hurler) (1886–1950), Irish hurler
 Mike Leahy (born 1966), British virologist and TV presenter
 Mick Leahy (footballer), Irish footballer